Proasellus parvulus is a species of isopod in the family Asellidae. It is found in Europe.

The IUCN conservation status of Proasellus parvulus is "VU", vulnerable. The species faces a high risk of endangerment in the medium term.

References

Isopoda
Articles created by Qbugbot
Crustaceans described in 1960